Megrino is a rural locality (a village) and the administrative center of Megrinskoye Rural Settlement, Chagodoshchensky District, Vologda Oblast, Russia. The population was 233 as of 2002. There are 3 streets.

Geography 
Gorka is the nearest rural locality.

References 

Rural localities in Chagodoshchensky District